PFC Slavia Sofia (Bulgarian: ПФК Славия София) is a Bulgarian football club founded on 10 April 1913 in Sofia. Slavia's ground is Slavia Stadium with a capacity of 15,992. The team's colours are white and black. During the 2014/15 campaign they took part in the following competitions: A PFG, Bulgarian Cup.

Competitions

A Group

First phase

Table

Results summary

Matches

Relegation round

Table

Results summary 

Slavia Sofia
PFC Slavia Sofia seasons